Wangi wangi or Wangi-wangi may refer to:

Places
Wangi-wangi Island, the north-west cluster of the Tukangbesi Islands, and is the seat of the Wakatobi Regency, part of the province of Southeast Sulawesi, Indonesia
Wangi Wangi, New South Wales,  a suburb of the City of Lake Macquarie in New South Wales, Australia

Animals
Wangi Wangi white-eye (''Zosterops'' sp. nov.),  a recently discovered endangered bird of the white-eye family. It was discovered in 2003 near the village of Wanci on Wangi-wangi Island, Indonesia.

See also